Nofekh is a community settlement in central Israel. Located in the Shephelah, it falls under the jurisdiction of Hevel Modi'in Regional Council.

Etymology
Its name is taken from one of the 12 stones in the Hoshen, the sacred breastplate worn by a Jewish high priest, mentioned in Exodus 28:18. Nearby Shoham, Bareqet, Leshem and Ahlama (the former name of Beit Arif) were also named after the Hoshen stones.

History
The village was established by immigrants from Morocco in 1949 on the land of the depopulated Palestinian village of Rantiya.

References 

Community settlements
Populated places established in 1949
Populated places in Central District (Israel)
1949 establishments in Israel
Moroccan-Jewish culture in Israel